Tellurone can mean:
 Telluroketone, a variant of a carbonyl having a tellurium atom in place of the oxygen
 A variant of a sulfone having a tellurium atom in place of the sulfur